Zane David Weiner is a film producer most known for his work with director Peter Jackson, serving as production manager for The Lord of the Rings trilogy, and as producer for the three-part The Hobbit film series.

Filmography

Producer

References

External links

Living people
1963 births